For All We Know may refer to:

"For All We Know" (1934 song), a song by Sam M. Lewis and J. Fred Coots
"For All We Know" (1970 song), a song by Robb Wilson, Fred Karlin, and Arthur James, made popular by the Carpenters
For All We Know (Ruud Jolie album), 2011
For All We Know (Nao album), 2016

See also
All We Know (disambiguation)